Powerleague is a leading operator of small sided football artificial pitches with 41 football centres in the UK, Ireland and Netherlands, based in Fitzrovia, London in England. It has an exclusive playing surface called “Power Pitch” which it claims to be the best artificial playing surface in the industry. It also has a successful league operations arm called Powerplay which runs and manages leagues in over 300 locations across the UK for both football and netball leagues.

Origins
In 1987 Keith Rogers opened the world’s first commercial 5-a-side football centre in Paisley under the brand name of Pitz,. He built a successful business with 11 centres and a site pipeline before selling the profitable business to 3i who rebranded the business as  Powerleague. Rogers immediately went on to found the highly successful rival business, Goals Soccer Centres.

In 2002, after the business went into decline under new management, 3i approached Tottenham Hotspur F.C. Chief Executive Claude Littner to take over the executive role. In 2003, Littner lead a management buyout of the firm, leaving 3i with a minority stake. Having listed on the Alternative Investment Market, in 2008 Powerleague took over the Soccerdome centres from JJB Sports in a £17.4M deal.

Private company
In 2018, three new board directors were appointed to steer the company through the CVA progress and lead the subsequent turnaround.  

Christian Rose, a turnaround specialist, was appointed as CEO, along with Mike Evans as CFO and John Gillespie as COO

Finances
Post the CVA in 2018, Powerleague has had a successful turnaround and in 2019 recorded revenues of over £28m with EBITDA of £2.8m.

Branding
From 2019, the two main company brands now stand alone as Powerleague and Powerplay with unique brand identities.

References

Youth football in the United Kingdom
Football in Scotland
Leisure companies of the United Kingdom
Companies based in Renfrewshire
Companies formerly listed on the Alternative Investment Market